Kermi is a village and municipality in Humla District in the Karnali Zone of north-western Nepal. At the time of the 1991 Nepal census, it had a population of 518 people living in 76 individual households.

References

External links
UN map of the municipalities of Dolpa District

Populated places in Humla District